Timothy Leif "T. J." Oshie (born December 23, 1986) is an American professional ice hockey right winger for the Washington Capitals of the National Hockey League (NHL). He was selected by the St. Louis Blues in the first round of the 2005 NHL Entry Draft, as the 24th overall pick.  He then spent the first seven years of his NHL career with the Blues before being traded to the Washington Capitals in 2015. Oshie won the Stanley Cup as a member of the Capitals in 2018.

Oshie is widely considered a shootout specialist in the NHL and is one of the top career leaders in goals scored and scoring percentage since the league adopted shootouts in overtime for the 2005–06 season.

Early years
Born in Mount Vernon, Washington, Oshie was raised in Everett, north of Seattle, and was on ice at age five in the Seattle Junior Hockey Association, where he played for ten years. Following his parents' amicable divorce, he lived in Stanwood with his mother Tina and attended Stanwood High School for his freshman year. In 2002, Oshie moved to Warroad, Minnesota, where his parents were originally from, and lived with his father, Tim, and his father's cousin.

He attended Warroad High School, where he was a star player on the hockey team for three seasons, leading the club to two Minnesota State Class A titles in 2003 and 2005. He made the state's All-Tournament Team all three years. With 100 points (37 goals and 63 assists) in 31 games as a senior, he led all Minnesota high school players in scoring, subsequently being named to the 2005 Associated Press and Pioneer Press All-State First Team and finishing as a Minnesota Mr. Hockey Finalist.

At the completion of his senior season with the Warriors in 2004–05, he attended the University of North Dakota, where he played for the Fighting Sioux.

Playing career

Amateur
Oshie started his career in the greater Seattle area, playing for Seattle Junior Hockey Association.  Then moved to Warroad, Minnesota when he was in bantam.  Following his draft, Oshie played for the University of North Dakota men's ice hockey team in the Western Collegiate Hockey Association (WCHA) for three seasons. Scoring a team-leading 24 goals as a freshman, he added 21 assists for 45 points total. He also set a school record with nine game-winning goals in the season, which also led all NCAA players. At the end of his debut season, he was named to the WCHA All-Rookie Team and the WCHA Final Five All-Tournament Team.

In his sophomore year, Oshie improved to 52 points (17 goals and 35 assists), ranking second in team scoring. He earned Third Team All-WCHA and received the Fighting Sioux's Cliff "Fido" Purpur Award, given to the player who demonstrates hard work and determination while generating excitement on the ice. Following North Dakota's WCHA playoff run, Oshie led all players with eight points (four goals and four assists) in the 2006 NCAA Tournament, earning NCAA West All-Tournament honors. He played his last season with North Dakota as a junior, recording 45 points in 42 games.

St. Louis Blues

On May 13, 2008, Oshie opted to forgo his senior season at North Dakota and signed with the St. Louis Blues. He scored his first career NHL goal on October 22, 2008, against the Detroit Red Wings. Oshie quickly became a fan favorite due to his fast and energetic style of play. Playing in 57 games, he scored 14 goals and 25 assists for 39 points during his rookie year. At the end of the season, he won the NHL's 2008–09 "Goal of the Year" honors, a fan-voted contest on the NHL's website.

Oshie broke his ankle in a fight with Samuel Påhlsson during a blowout loss against the Columbus Blue Jackets early in the 2010–11 season, missing three months due to the injury.

In 2013–14, Oshie had 21 goals and 39 assists for a career-high 60 points.

Washington Capitals
On July 2, 2015, Oshie was traded by the Blues to the Washington Capitals in exchange for Troy Brouwer, Pheonix Copley and a third-round draft pick in 2016. Oshie wears number 77 for the Capitals, as his previous number 74 is currently worn by Capitals defenseman John Carlson.

Oshie had a successful first season with the Capitals, often finding himself playing on the Capitals' top line with Alexander Ovechkin and Nicklas Bäckström. Oshie finished the season with a career high 26 goals, helping the team win their second Presidents' Trophy. During Game 1 of the Capitals' second round series against the Pittsburgh Penguins, Oshie scored a hat trick, the third goal of which came in overtime, giving the Capitals a 4–3 win. Despite this, the Capitals would lose the series in six games. In 2016-17, Oshie would further extend his career-high in goals to 33 en route to a second consecutive President’s Trophy for the Capitals.

On June 23, 2017, Oshie signed an eight-year, $46 million contract with an annual average of $5.75 million to remain with the Capitals.

Oshie saw his production drop to 18 goals and 47 points in 72 games in 2017-18, but would play a crucial role in the Capitals 2018 Stanley Cup victory, scoring 8 goals (including 6 on the powerplay) and 21 points in 24 playoff games. On June 7, 2018, the Capitals defeated the first-year expansion Vegas Golden Knights in Game 5 of the 2018 Stanley Cup Final for their first Stanley Cup in franchise history. He is one of only 43 players to ever have 6 or more power play goals in a single playoffs.

In a November 7, 2018, game against the Penguins, Oshie was injured twice on the ice and came back to score the winning goal with 1:14 minutes left in the game. Oshie was sent to the training room twice, the first time requiring two stitches to a cut near his left eye created by an opponent's stick. He then took an shoulder check to the head from Evgeni Malkin. On November 14, in a 3–1 loss to the Winnipeg Jets, Oshie suffered a possible concussion when he was slammed down by the Jets' defenseman Josh Morrissey, who was later fined for unsportsmanlike conduct. Oshie has four reported concussions in his NHL career. After missing 11 games, he returned for a December 11, 2018 home game against the Detroit Red Wings, scoring a goal in the 6-2 Caps win.

On April 18, 2019, during Game 4 of the First Round series between the Capitals and the Carolina Hurricanes, Oshie was severely injured after being cross-checked into the boards by Hurricanes forward Warren Foegele. Later tests revealed the injury to be a broken collarbone, and Oshie was ruled out indefinitely. Oshie ultimately missed the remainder of the series, which the Capitals lost in 7 games.

On January 11, 2020,  Oshie was voted into the 2020 National Hockey League All-Star Game along with Mitch Marner, Quinn Hughes, and David Perron. That season he led all Eastern Conference players with a 20.8% shooting percentage and 13 power play goals.

International play
 

Oshie represented the United States at the 2006 World Junior Championships in Vancouver. Following the Blues' elimination in the 2009 Stanley Cup playoffs, he received his first senior national team callup for the 2009 IIHF World Championship, also competing in the 2010 Championship, scoring four goals and two assists in six games. In 2012, he was the last addition of the American roster after the Blues were eliminated in the second round of the 2012 playoffs.

On January 1, 2014, Oshie was named to the American roster for the 2014 Winter Olympics, along with Blues teammates David Backes and Kevin Shattenkirk. Oshie was a player on the "bubble," as he was one of several American-born players being considered for one of Team USA's final roster spots. Oshie was eventually chosen in large part due to his high success rate in shootouts. On February 15, in a preliminary-round game against Russia, Oshie was repeatedly selected by Team USA Head Coach Dan Bylsma to participate in a shootout that ultimately resulted in a 3–2 American victory. Oshie was the first of three shooters to face goaltender Sergei Bobrovsky in the shootout, followed by teammates James van Riemsdyk and Joe Pavelski. After the score remained tied after the first three rounds, international rules stipulated that coaches could re-use players as often as desired. Oshie was subsequently tabbed by Bylsma five consecutive times, ultimately converting four of six shot attempts, including the shootout-winner in the eighth round.

Player profile

Barry Trotz, former coach of the Washington Capitals, describes Oshie in this way: "Osh is a hockey player. Obviously, he brings energy and he does all of those things, but in simplest terms, he loves playing. He enjoys being around the guys all of the time. He enjoys the battles, he enjoys the competition, and he does it with a smile on his face, you know?" Oshie himself hopes his approach to ice hockey inspires others: "I think you’ve just got to enjoy the competition in playoffs. I think it’s the most fun part of our sport is when everyone’s giving their best and it’s you versus another guy. Sometimes, it’s not always the skill. It’s just the will to win a battle, and I don’t know, for some reason, that gets me going. That gets me excited. When I play that way, I hope it can be somewhat of an inspiration to some of the younger guys or just even the other guys that are able to see it."

Personal life
Oshie has three siblings, a brother Taylor and two sisters, Tawni and Aleah Oshie. He attended the University of North Dakota in Grand Forks for three years, majoring in general studies. His first cousin, Gary Sargent, and second cousin, Henry Boucha, played in the NHL.

Oshie is from the Anishinaabe or Ojibwe Nation; his name in Anishinaabemowin, or the Ojibwe language, “Keeway Gaaboo,” means "coming home." Giiwe translates roughly as "s/he returns home." If the -aaboo in Gaaboo refers to water, then this name may evoke the poetic image of water that, by traveling downhill, will inevitably find its way home to a larger body of water, such as the Great Lakes or the sea. His father was Anishnaabe.

According to a 2009 interview, the nickname "T. J." was given to him by his mother after she saw the film The Champ, because Oshie reminded her of the main character's son, who is named T. J. Flynn.

In January 2007, Oshie and former North Dakota teammate Jonathan Toews received alcohol-related citations for being minors in a Grand Forks, North Dakota, tavern. Oshie and Toews pleaded guilty to the charges. The two were later placed on probation and ordered to perform community service.

Oshie and his wife Lauren Cosgrove Oshie have three daughters, and one son. The family resides in McLean, Virginia. Their first-born daughter had been born with gastroschisis, for which she required surgery.

Oshie's father, Tim, suffered from Alzheimer's disease. Tim died on May 4, 2021, at the age of 56.

Career statistics

Regular season and playoffs

International

Awards and honors

Notes

References

External links

 
 T.J. Oshie on FightingSioux.com

1986 births
Living people
American men's ice hockey centers
Ice hockey people from Washington (state)
Ice hockey players at the 2014 Winter Olympics
National Hockey League first-round draft picks
Native American sportspeople
North Dakota Fighting Hawks men's ice hockey players
Ojibwe people
Olympic ice hockey players of the United States
People from Mount Vernon, Washington
Sioux Falls Stampede players
Stanley Cup champions
St. Louis Blues draft picks
St. Louis Blues players
Washington Capitals players
People from Stanwood, Washington
Sportspeople from Everett, Washington
AHCA Division I men's ice hockey All-Americans